Roché Emanuelson (born April 5, 1982) is a Surinamese footballer who plays as a defender for Boma Star in the Hoofdklasse, and for the Suriname national team. He has also played for SV Transvaal, SV Robinhood, Royal '95 and SV Leo Victor in the past.

He also plays futsal, having played for Styx Kuldipsingh, and for Telesur in the SZVB Hoofdklasse and for the national futsal team.

Career 
Emanuelson began his career in Paramaribo, Suriname. In 1999, he made his debut in the Hoofdklasse playing for SV Transvaal, helping his side to the national championship, winning the Surinamese Footballer of the Year award by the end of the season. The following season, however, no competition was held in Suriname. In 2002, he signed with SV Robinhood, the former club of his heralded Uncle Errol Emanuelson. After two seasons, Emanuelson transferred once more, this time to Royal '95, only to return to Robinhood after three seasons.  In 2009 Emanuelson signed with SV Leo Victor whom he helped to win the Surinamese Cup in 2014, having also played in the CFU Club Championship. The following season saw Emanuelson join his fifth club in the league when he signed with Boma Star.

International career 
Emanuelson plays for the Suriname national team. He has played in FIFA World Cup qualification matches, as well as the CFU Championship. In 2010, he helped Suriname to win the ABCS Tournament, scoring once in the final against Curaçao, in a 2–2 draw which was decided on penalties.

Personal life
Emanuelson is the nephew of former Suriname International football star Errol Emanuelson. His cousins are Dutch International footballer Urby Emanuelson, and former professional footballer Julian Emanuelson both brothers, and their sister Sharifa Emanuelson, a former basketball player in the Netherlands.

Career statistics

International goals
Scores and results list Suriname' goal tally first.

Honors

Club
S.V. Transvaal
 SVB Hoofdklasse: 1999–2000

S.V. Leo Victor
 Surinamese Cup: 2014

International
Suriname
 ABCS Tournament: 2010

Individual
Surinamese Footballer of the Year: 2000

References

External links

Living people
1982 births
Sportspeople from Paramaribo
Surinamese footballers
Surinamese men's futsal players
Suriname international footballers
S.V. Leo Victor players
S.V. Robinhood players
S.V. Transvaal players
SVB Eerste Divisie players
Association football defenders